Víkingsvöllur is a football stadium in Reykjavík, Iceland. It is currently used for football matches and is the home ground of Víkingur F.C. The stadium holds around 2,000, with 1,149 seats, and is located at 'Traðarland' in Fossvogsdalur, south-east of the city center

Stats
Size:
Record attendance: 2,023 tickets versus Leiknir Reykjavík, 2021
Opening game:

References

Football venues in Iceland